Zelenecká Lhota is a village and municipality in Jičín District in the Hradec Králové Region of the Czech Republic.

Administrative parts
The village of Záhuby is an administrative part of Zelenecká Lhota.

History
The first written mention of Zelenecká Lhota is from 1532.

References

Villages in Jičín District